Hector Mahoney (8 September 1913 – 25 September 1991) was an Australian cricketer. He played in three first-class matches for Queensland in 1937/38.

See also
 List of Queensland first-class cricketers

References

External links
 

1913 births
1991 deaths
Australian cricketers
Queensland cricketers
People from Maryborough, Queensland
Cricketers from Queensland